Balearic may refer to:

Of the Balearic Islands
The Balearic dialect of Catalan
Balearic horse, a term sometimes used to describe either or both of these horse breeds in the region:
Mallorquín
Menorquín horse
Balearic beat, a style of electronic dance music
Balearic cuisine